The Second Shadow Cabinet of Alexis Tsipras was formed on 18 July 2019, following the 2019 Greek legislative election. It consists of only Syriza MPs, as it is the largest party in opposition to the Kyriakos Mitsotakis Government.

History

The Shadow Cabinet was formed on 18 July 2019, with the composition being announced that day. The Shadow Cabinet is acting in opposition to the Mitsotakis Government.

Role of shadow ministers

The role of shadow ministers is to oversee the work being carried out by the government ministers and to offer alternative proposals.

Shadow Cabinet composition

 Leader of the Opposition and Leader of Syriza – Alexis Tsipras

 Shadow Minister for Foreign Affairs – George Katrougalos
Deputy for European Issues: Sia Anagnostopoulou

 Shadow Minister of Finance – Euclid Tsakalotos
Deputies: Katerina Papanatsiou, Tryfon Alexiadis

 Shadow Minister for the Interior – Christos Spirtzis
Deputy: Pavlos Polakis
Deputy for Macedonia-Thrace Issues: Theodora Augeri

 Shadow Development and Investment Minister – Nikos Pappas
Deputy: Giorgos Tsipras

 Shadow Labour Minister – Efi Achtsioglou
Deputy: Theano Fotiou

 Shadow Minister for Citizen Protection – Giannis Ragousis
Deputy for Migration Policy: Giorgos Psyxogios

 Shadow Minister for Energy – Sokrates Famellos
Deputy for Environmental Issues: Chara Kafantari

 Shadow Health Minister – Andreas Xanthos
Deputy: Andreas Mixahlidis

 Shadow Education Minister – Nikos Filis
Deputy: Meropi Tzoufi

 Shadow Tourism Minister – Katerina Notopoulou

 Shadow Minister for National Defence – Thodoris Dritsas

 Shadow Justice Minister – Spyros Lappas

 Shadow Culture and Sports Minister – Panos Skouyoliakos
Deputy for Sports Issues: Giannis Bournous

 Shadow Shipping Minister – Nektarios Santorinios 

 Shadow Infrastructure and Transport Minister – Giorgos Varemenos
Deputy for Transportation Issues: Theopisti Perka

 Shadow Digital Policy Minister – Marios Katsis

 Shadow Agriculture Development Minister – Spyros Araxovitis
Deputy: Vasilis Kokkalis

 Coordinator of the Commission of Oversight of Government Policy – Alexandros Flampouraris 

As of 18 July 2019

References

Greek shadow cabinets
Cabinets established in 2019
2019 in Greek politics
Syriza
Alexis Tsipras